In statistics and econometrics, the multivariate probit model is a generalization of the probit model used to estimate several correlated binary outcomes jointly. For example, if it is believed that the decisions of sending at least one child to public school and that of voting in favor of a school budget are correlated (both decisions are binary), then the multivariate probit model would be appropriate for jointly predicting these two choices on an individual-specific basis. J.R. Ashford and R.R. Sowden initially proposed an approach for multivariate probit analysis. Siddhartha Chib and Edward Greenberg extended this idea and also proposed simulation-based inference methods for the multivariate probit model which simplified and generalized parameter estimation.

Example: bivariate probit
In the ordinary probit model, there is only one binary dependent variable  and so only one latent variable  is used.
It is assumed that each observed variable takes on the value 1 if and only if its underlying continuous latent variable takes on a positive value:

 

 

with

 

and

 

To do so, the likelihood of the model has to be maximized. This likelihood is

 

 

After some rewriting, the log-likelihood function becomes:

 

Multivariate Probit
 
 
Where  and,
 

The log-likelihood function in this case would be 

Except for  typically there is no closed form solution to the integrals in the log-likelihood equation. Instead simulation methods can be used to simulated the choice probabilities. Methods using importance sampling include the GHK algorithm (Geweke, Hajivassilou, McFadden and Keane), AR (accept-reject), Stern's method. There are also MCMC approaches to this problem including CRB (Chib's method with Rao-Blackwellization), CRT (Chib, Ritter, Tanner), ARK (accept-reject kernel), and ASK (adaptive sampling kernel). A variational approach scaling to large datasets is proposed in Probit-LMM (Mandt, Wenzel, Nakajima et al.).

References

Further reading
 Greene, William H., Econometric Analysis, seventh edition, Prentice-Hall, 2012.

Regression models